Peter Smith (born 27 March 1953) is a Canadian ice hockey coach and  coaching mentor of the McGill Redbirds and Martlets programs at McGill University in Montreal. He was the head coach of the McGill Martlets ice hockey program for twenty seasons, during 1999 to 2020, and is the winningest coach in McGill ice hockey history. Smith amassed a 534-229-33 (.671) career record behind the McGill bench.

Over his four national championship seasons, the team posted a combined 131-5-0 record against Canadian university opponents.

The 2007-08 title marked the first McGill women's team in any sport to capture a CIS / U SPORTS championship. The next season, the Martlets repeated as national champs, going undefeated in league (18-0) and post-season action (7-0) for the second straight year. The third crown was won in 2010-11, when the Martlets went 33-0 against CIS teams, including a 20-0 record in league play and a 7-0 mark in post-season play. The fourth title was in 2013-14, when the Martlets registered a 29-4 mark against CIS teams, including 18-2 in league play and 6-2 in the post-season.

On June 13, 2018, it was announced that the 2007-08 Martlets team would be inducted into the McGill Sports Hall of Fame on October 11, 2018.

A native of Lachine, Quebec, Smith was the head coach of the Canadian national women's hockey team for the 2007–08 international season, in addition to serving as an assistant coach with Team Canada under Melody Davidson for five seasons. He won two Olympic gold medals during his international coaching career, in the women's ice hockey tournament at the 2006 Winter Olympics in Turin, Italy and in the women's ice hockey tournament at the 2010 Winter Olympics in Vancouver, Canada.

References

External links
 Peter Smith team staff profile at EliteProspects.com

Ice hockey people from Montreal
Canadian ice hockey coaches
McGill Martlets women's ice hockey
McGill University alumni
Academic staff of McGill University
1953 births

Living people
People from Lachine, Quebec